Herbert Lütkebohmert (24 March 1948 – 29 October 1993) was a German footballer who played for TSV Marl-Hüls, Schalke 04 and 1. FC Bocholt.

References

External links 

 
 

1948 births
1993 deaths
German footballers
FC Schalke 04 players
Bundesliga players
1. FC Bocholt players
Association football midfielders
People from Borken (district)
Sportspeople from Münster (region)
Footballers from North Rhine-Westphalia
West German footballers